The 2023 FIBA Intercontinental Cup will be the 33rd edition of the FIBA Intercontinental Cup. The tournament will be held from 21 September to 24 September 2024 and will be hosted in the Singapore Indoor Stadium in Singapore. It is the first time Singapore hosted the tournament, as well as the first time the tournament was held in Asia.

It was the second Intercontinental Cup in the same year, as the tournament cycle was changed to September to better adapt the club's schedules. It is also the first tournament under an expanded format with six teams, with a team from Asia being added.

Teams 
Contrary to the previous seasons, the NBA G League Ignite were pre-selected as representatives for the NBA G League and were the first known team to participate.

Venue 

The 2023 season will be the first of three tournaments to be held in Singapore in the Singapore Indoor Stadium, under an agreement between FIBA and Sport Singapore, an organisation controlled by the country's government. Opened in 1989, the indoor arena can host 12,000 people for sporting events and is located in the Singapore Sports Hub.

References 

September 2023 sports events in Asia
FIBA Intercontinental Cup
2022–23 in Asian basketball
2022–23 in basketball leagues
Basketball in Singapore